Euchromatic histone-lysine N-methyltransferase 1, also known as G9a-like protein (GLP), is a protein that in humans is encoded by the EHMT1 gene.

Structure 

EHMT1 messenger RNA is alternatively spliced to produce three predicted protein isoforms.  Starting from the N-terminus, the canonical isoform one has eight ankyrin repeats, a pre-SET, and a SET domains.  Isoforms two and three have missing or incomplete C-terminal SET domains respectively.

Function 

G9A-like protein (GLP) shares an evolutionary conserved SET domain with G9A, responsible for methyltransferase activity. The SET domain primarily functions to establish and maintain H3K9 mono and di-methylation, a marker of faculative heterochromatin. When transiently over expressed, G9A and GLP form homo- and heterodimers via their SET domain. However, endogenously both enzymes function exclusively as a heteromeric complex. Although G9A and GLP can exert their methyltransferase activities independently in vitro, if either G9a or Glp are knocked out in vivo, global levels of H3K9me2 are severely reduced and are equivalent to H3K9me2 levels in G9a and Glp double knockout mice. Therefore, it is thought that G9A cannot compensate for the loss of GLP methyltransferase activity in vivo, and vice versa. Another important functional domain, which G9A and GLP both share, is a region containing ankryin repeats, which is involved in protein-protein interactions. The ankyrin repeat domain also contains H3K9me1 and H3K9me2 binding sites. Therefore, the G9A/GLP complex can both methylate histone tails and bind to mono- and di-methylated H3K9 to recruit molecules, such as DNA methyltransferases, to the chromatin. H3K9me2 is a reversible modification and can be removed by a wide range of histone lysine demethylases (KDMs) including KDM1, KDM3, KDM4 and KDM7 family members.

In addition to their role as histone lysine methyltransferases (HMTs), several studies have shown that G9A/GLP are also able to methylate a wide range of non-histone proteins. However, as most of the reported methylation sites have been derived from mass spectrometry analyses, the function of many of these modifications remain unknown. Nevertheless, increasing evidence suggests methylation of non-histone proteins may influence protein stability, protein-protein interactions and regulate cellular signalling pathways. For example, G9A/GLP can methylate a number of transcription factors to regulate their transcriptional activity, including MyoD, C/EBP, Reptin, p53, MEF2D, MEF2C and MTA1. Furthermore, G9A/GLP are able to methylate non-histone proteins to regulate complexes which recruit DNA methyltransferases to gene promoters to repress transcription via the methylation of CpG islands. Therefore, G9A and/or GLP have wide-ranging roles in development, establishing and maintaining cell identity, cell cycle regulation, and cellular responses to environmental stimuli,  which are dependent on their non-histone protein methyltransferase activity.

Clinical significance 

Defects in this gene are a cause of chromosome 9q subtelomeric deletion syndrome (9q-syndrome or Keefstra syndrome-1).

Dysregulation of EHMT1 has been implicated in inflammatory and cardiovascular diseases.

References

External links 
 

EC 2.1.1